Valerian Revenco (1 December 1939 – 5 March 2016) was a Moldovan politician who was Minister of Labor, Family and Social Protection (1999-2005) and Minister of Health (2005). He has been awarded the titles of Glory of Work and The Order of the Republic. Revenco was married and had one child.

References

1939 births
Living people
People from Bălți
Government ministers of Moldova
Recipients of the Order of the Republic (Moldova)